Schöder is a municipality in the district of Murau in the Austrian state of Styria.

Geography
Schöder lies at the foot of the Sölk Pass, which leads from the Mur valley to the Enns valley.

References

Rottenmann and Wölz Tauern
Cities and towns in Murau District